Moonlight (Chinese: 月光变奏曲) is a 2021 Chinese romantic comedy television series starring Yu Shuxin, Ding Yuxi, Yang Shize, and Ma Yinyin. Adapted from Qing Mei's novel Here's Chu Li (初礼来了), it revolves around the career and romance between an editor and an author, as well as the challenges in the publishing industry. The series aired exclusively on iQIYI at 20:00 (CST) starting from May 20, 2021.

It is the first drama part of Sweet On Theater (恋恋剧场), an iQIYI original lineup of romantic television series.

Synopsis 
After graduating from university, with a passion for publishing, Chu Li (Yu Shuxin) successfully entered her dream company Yuan Yue Books. However, a challenging path lies ahead of her and she is shocked to find out that the publishing industry has undergone huge changes. Famous author Zhou Chuan (Ding Yuxi) is said to be gentle as jade when he’s really not; the two are immediately at odds due to their different perspectives. With her sincerity, professionalism as well as unique vision, Chu Li earns the respect of renowned authors and helped authors who are at their bottleneck stage find new inspiration. She eventually discovers that  Zhou Chuan is her close online friend, and they gradually overcome obstacles together, advancing both romantically and professionally.

Cast

Main 
 Yu Shuxin as Chu Li
 A passionate newcomer editor who sticks to her original aspirations, wholeheartedly dedicating to helping authors refine their works and publish high-quality books.
 Ding Yuxi as Zhou Chuan
 A famous author who is said to be gentle as jade, but only people in the publishing industry know of his true image.
 Yang Shize as Jiang Yucheng
 An author who is suffering from writer's block, and he is Zhou Chuan's close friend.
 Ma Yinyin as Gu Baizhi
 An established content planning director from Xin Yun Books.

Supporting

Yuan Yue Books
 Wang Ting as Yu Yao
 Paul Chun as Chief Editor Xia
 Zhu Yongteng as Liang Chonglang
 Zhou Pu as Lao Miao
 He Xinlin as Suo Heng
 Hua Tong as A Xiang
 Jing Ruyang as Du Niaoniao
 Yang Tingting as Li Xianyu
 Qu Gang as President Yang

Chu Li and Zhou Chuan's family
 He Yunqing as Zhou Guxuan (Zhou Chuan's Father)
 Zhou Ling as Zhou Chuan's Mother
 Tian Miao as Chu Li's Mother
 Li Hongquan as Chu Li's Father

Others
 Ye Xiaowei as Fei Yun
 Xiong Yuting as Song Xi
 Wang Hongyi as Xiao Bai
 Sun Gelu as Jian Niangniang (Cocoon Empress)
 Li Yize as Luo Wen
 Dong Kefei as Hema (Hippo)
 Jiang Yuwei as Nana
 Wang Zijun as Li Wei

Soundtrack

Production 
It began filming on September 26, 2020 in Suzhou, China. They held their boot camp ceremony on October 10, 2020, and wrapped up on January 6, 2021.

Reception 
Moonlight received positive reviews and earned a 7.0 score on Douban. It has been praised for its skillful adaptation of the original novel, reasonable characters, and the acting performance of the cast. During its run, the series and actors also topped several media rankings such as the Guduo TV series list, Maoyan TV series list, Yunhe Data series popularity list, Weibo TV series list, etc.

References 

2021 Chinese television series debuts